The Alberni–Clayoquot Regional District of British Columbia is located on west central Vancouver Island. Adjacent regional districts it shares borders with are the Strathcona and Comox Valley Regional Districts to the north, and the Nanaimo and Cowichan Valley Regional Districts to the east. The regional district offices are located in Port Alberni.

Communities

Cities
 Port Alberni - Pop 17,678

Regional District Electoral Areas
 Area A (Bamfield)
 Bamfield - Pop 179
 Kildonan
 Sarita
 Area B (Beaufort)
 Area C (Long Beach)
 Estevan Point
 Port Alberni
 Area D (Sproat Lake)
 Great Central
 Kleecoot
 Sproat Lake
 Area E (Beaver Creek)
 Area F (Cherry Creek)

District Municipalities
 Tofino - Pop 1,932
 Ucluelet - Pop 1,717

Indian Reserves
NB Indian Reserves are not part of municipal or regional district governance and are outside the regional district's jurisdiction, and also counted separately in the census figures. Population figures here are from the 2006 census:
 Ahahswinis IR No. 1 pop. 148 
 Alberni IR No. 2 pop. 5 
 Anacla IR No. 12 pop. 95 
 Clakamucus IR No. 2 pop. 5 
 Elhlateese IR No. 2 pop. 27 
 Esowista IR No. 3 pop. 160 
 Hesquiat IR No. 1 pop. 10 
 Ittatsoo IR No. 1 pop. 200 
 Keeshan IR No. 9 Pop. 0 
 Klehkoot IR No. 2 pop. 10 
 Macoah IR No. 1 pop. 19 
 Marktosis IR No. 15 pop. 661 
 Numukamis IR No. 1 pop. 5 
 Openit IR No. 27 pop. 0 
 Opitsat IR No. 1 pop. 174 
 Refuge Cove IR No. 6 pop. 103 
 Sachsa IR No. 4 pop. 0 
 Stuart Bay IR No. 6 pop. 0 
 Tsahaheh IR No. 1 pop. 425

Highways
Highways that run through the Alberni–Clayoquot Regional District:
 Highway 4

Demographics

Note: Totals greater than 100% due to multiple origin responses.

See also
List of historic places in the Alberni-Clayoquot Regional District

Notes

References

 Community Profile: Alberni–Clayoquot Regional District, British Columbia; Statistics Canada

External links

 
Alberni-Clayoquot
West Coast of Vancouver Island